The Mimics and Gesture Theatre is a theatre located in the Eastern Administrative Okrug of Moscow, Russia. It offers special sessions for deaf people.

The theatre is located in Izmailovsky bulv., 39/41 (Pervomayskaya metro station)

References 

Theatres in Moscow
Deaf culture
Deafness arts organizations
Disability organizations based in Russia
Disability theatre